The Holder of the World,  (1993)  is a novel by Bharati Mukherjee.  It is a retelling of  Nathaniel Hawthorne's 1850 novel The Scarlet Letter, placing the story in two centuries (17th and 20th).  The novel involves time travel via virtual reality, locating itself in 20th century Boston, 17th century Colonial America, and 17th century India during the spread of the British East India Company. It also references Thomas Pynchon's novel, V.. The book was among the contenders in a 2014 list by The Telegraph of the 10 all-time greatest Asian novels.

Publication history
 Hardcover — , published in September 1993 by Alfred A. Knopf.
 Paperback — , published in September 1994 by Random House

References

 Srikanth, Rajini. The World Next Door: South Asian American Literature and the Idea of America. Philadelphia: Temple University Press, 2004: 187-192.

External links
Holders of the Word:An Interview with Bharati Mukherjee
Breaking the Borders of Gendered Space: Female Characters in Aritha van Herk's No Fixed Address and Bharati Mukherjee's The Holder of the World
Reader's guide
Powells book review
A Selected Annotated Bibliography

1993 American novels
Parallel literature
Novels by Bharati Mukherjee
Alfred A. Knopf books
Novels set in Boston
Novels set in India
Novels set in the American colonial era
Novels about time travel
Chatto & Windus books
Works based on The Scarlet Letter